Troy (Hangul: 트로이) is a South Korean Hip hop boy band formed by Brand New Music in 2014.  The group consists of 4 members: Bumkey, Jaewoong, Changwoo, and Kanto. Troy debuted on March 14, 2014, with "Green Light".

Discography

Singles

References

External links
 

K-pop music groups
Musical groups established in 2014
South Korean boy bands
South Korean dance music groups
South Korean pop music groups
Musical groups from Seoul
2014 establishments in South Korea